The Swindall Tourist Inn is the last known surviving African American boarding house in Phoenix, Arizona used during the Jim Crow era. The building itself was built in 1913 and was sold in 1940. Until its selling, it was used as a boarding house, predominantly for African American lodgers. The building has since been converted to office use.

References

Buildings and structures in Maricopa County, Arizona
National Register of Historic Places in Maricopa County, Arizona
1913 establishments in Arizona
Hotel buildings completed in 1913
African-American history of Arizona